Lymantes is a genus of true weevils in the beetle family Curculionidae. There are about nine described species in Lymantes.

Species
These nine species belong to the genus Lymantes:
 Lymantes arkansasensis Sleeper, 1965
 Lymantes dietrichi Sleeper, 1965
 Lymantes fowleri Anderson, 2016
 Lymantes nadineae Anderson in Paquin & Anderson in Cokendolfer & Reddell (eds.), 2009
 Lymantes obrieni Anderson, 2016
 Lymantes puteolatum (Dury, 1901)
 Lymantes sandersoni Sleeper, 1965
 Lymantes scrobicollis Gyllenhal, 1838
 Lymantes squamirostris Osella, 1989

References

Further reading

 
 
 

Molytinae
Articles created by Qbugbot